Snake Creek Recreation Area is a South Dakota state recreation area in Charles Mix County, South Dakota in the United States. The area is open for year-round recreation including camping, swimming, fishing, hiking and boating. There are 115 campsites, 10 camper cabins, and a full-service marina.

See also
Lake Francis Case

References

External links

 Snake Creek Recreation Area - South Dakota Game, Fish, and Parks
 Lake Francis Case - U.S. Army Corps of Engineers

Protected areas of Charles Mix County, South Dakota
Protected areas of South Dakota
State parks of South Dakota